The Race for Space may refer to:

 Space Race, Cold War geopolitical powered race for space primacy
 The Race for Space (film), a 1959 American documentary film
 Black Sky: The Race For Space (2004), a Discovery Channel documentary about the Ansari X-Prize and SpaceShipOne
 Race for Space, a 2008 DVD release of the Playhouse Disney/Disney Junior series, Little Einsteins
 The Race for Space (album), a 2015 album by the band Public Service Broadcasting

See also
Race to Space, 2001 drama film set in the 1960s Space Race
 "Race to Space" (Masters of Sex), season 1 episode 2 aired 6 October 2013
 Buzz Aldrin's Race Into Space, 1993 space simulation computer game
Space Race (disambiguation)